Mainur Reza Chowdhury (23 June 1938 – 26 June 2004) was a Bangladeshi jurist who served as the 12th Chief Justice of Bangladesh between 18 June 2002 and 22 June 2003. He was appointed to the role by former President Badruddoza Chowdhury.

Early life and family
Chowdhury was born on 23 June 1938 to an aristocratic Bengali Muslim family known as the Zamindars of Monakosha in Nawabganj, Malda district, Bengal Presidency. His father, Murtaza Raza Choudhry, was a former Finance Minister of East Pakistan and a member of the 1st National Assembly of Pakistan. His great-grandfather, Ismail Hossain Choudhry, was the zamindar of Kotalpukur in Bihar. Chowdhury's mother, Syeda Roqeya Akhtar, belonged to the Syeds of Taraf that had relocated to Comilla. His maternal aunt, Syeda Selena Akhtar, was the wife of politician Fazlul Qadir Chaudhry.

Career
Chowdhury was appointed a Supreme Court judge in 1990 and was elevated to the appellate division in 2000.

Personal life
Chowdhury was married to Najma Chowdhury, an academic.

References

1938 births
2004 deaths
People from Chapai Nawabganj district
Supreme Court of Bangladesh justices
Chief justices of Bangladesh
Burials at Banani Graveyard
Bangladeshi people of Bihari descent